Považská Bystrica District is a district in the Trenčín Region of western Slovakia. Until 1918, the district was part of the county of Kingdom of Hungary of Trencsén.

Municipalities

See also 
Dolný Moštenec

References 

Districts of Slovakia
Trenčín Region